{{Infobox election
| election_name = 1984 United States Senate election in South Carolina
| country = South Carolina
| type = presidential
| ongoing = no
| previous_election = 1978 United States Senate election in South Carolina
| previous_year = 1978
| next_election = 1990 United States Senate election in South Carolina
| next_year = 1990
| election_date = November 6, 1984
| image_size         = 125x136px

| image1 = Strom Thurmond.jpg
| nominee1 = Strom Thurmond
| party1 = Republican Party (United States)
| popular_vote1 = 644,814
| percentage1 = 66.8%| image2 = No image.svg
| nominee2 = Melvin Purvis
| party2 = Democratic Party (United States)
| popular_vote2 = 306,982	
| percentage2 = 31.8%

| map_image = 1984 United States Senate election in South Carolina results map by county.svg
| map_size = 220px
| map_caption = County resultsThurmond:     Purvis: 

| title = U.S. Senator
| before_election = Strom Thurmond
| before_party = Republican Party (United States)
| after_election = Strom Thurmond
| after_party = Republican Party (United States)
}}

The 1984 South Carolina United States Senate election was held on November 6, 1984 to select the U.S. Senator from the state of South Carolina.  Popular incumbent Republican Senator Strom Thurmond cruised to re-election against Democratic challenger Melvin Purvis.

Democratic primary
The South Carolina Democratic Party held their primary on June 12, 1984.  Melvin Purvis, a minister and the son of famous FBI agent Melvin Purvis, won a close race against photographer Cecil J. Williams.  The closeness of the race and the fact that the black candidate did not win propelled Jesse Jackson to request a Justice Department investigation into the primary and he also considered an independent bid for the seat.  Governor Richard Riley and 3rd district Representative Butler Derrick flirted with running, but backed down when Thurmond received endorsements from prominent Democrats in South Carolina.

Republican primary
The South Carolina Republican Party held their primary on June 12, 1984.  Senator Strom Thurmond easily defeated Bob Cunningham to advance to the general election.

General election campaign
Thurmond received endorsements from former Democratic governor Robert Evander McNair, Charleston mayor Joseph P. Riley Jr., and an assortment of black mayors in the state.  He did not face a serious challenge and spent almost $1.5 million on the race whereas Purvis spent less than $10,000. An ironic footnote to the election is the fact that Purvis used Thurmond's age as an issue in the campaign. He claimed Thurmond was too old, yet Purvis died less than two years after the election of a heart attack at age 46.

Election results

 
 

|-
| 
| colspan=5 |Republican hold'''
|-

See also
 1984 United States Senate elections
 List of United States senators from South Carolina

References
 
 

South Carolina
1984
1984 South Carolina elections
Strom Thurmond